Western Avenue may refer to:

United Kingdom
Western Avenue (London)

United States
Western Avenue (Albany, New York)
Western Avenue (Chicago)
Western Avenue (Los Angeles)
Western Avenue (Washington, D.C.)
Western Avenue (Metra Milwaukee District/North Line) on the Milwaukee District/North Line, Milwaukee District/West Line, and North Central Service
Western Avenue (Metra BNSF Railway Line) on the BNSF Railway Line